Eric Royston Young (born 26 November 1952) is an English former professional footballer who played in the Football League, as a midfielder.

References

1952 births
Living people
Footballers from Stockton-on-Tees
Footballers from County Durham
English footballers
Association football midfielders
Manchester United F.C. players
Peterborough United F.C. players
Walsall F.C. players
Stockport County F.C. players
Darlington F.C. players
Whitby Town F.C. players
English Football League players